Pinsk District is an administrative subdivision, a raion of Brest Region, in Belarus. Its administrative center is Pinsk.

Demographics
At the time of the Belarus Census (2009), Pinsk District had a population of 51,997. Of these, 92.2% were of Belarusian, 2.6% Russian, 2.6% Ukrainian and 1.6% Polish ethnicity. 70.7% spoke Belarusian and 26.0% Russian as their native language.

Pinsk district in literature 
Pinskaja Šliachta [Pinsk Nobility] by Vintsent Dunin-Martsinkyevich (1866)

Notable residents 

Raman Skirmunt (1868, Parečča village – 1939), politician, supporter of the Belarusian independence movement

References

External links 

 Photos on Radzima.org

 
Districts of Brest Region